The Library Company of Philadelphia (LCP) is a non-profit organization based on Locust Street in Center City Philadelphia. Founded in 1731 by Benjamin Franklin as a library, the Library Company of Philadelphia has accumulated one of the most significant collections of historically valuable manuscripts and printed material in the United States.

The current collection size is approximately 500,000 books and 70,000 other items, including 2,150 items that once belonged to Franklin, the Mayflower Compact, major collections of 17th-century and Revolution-era pamphlets and ephemera, maps, and whole libraries assembled in the 18th and 19th centuries. The collection also includes first editions of Moby-Dick and Leaves of Grass.

Early history
The Library Company was an offshoot of the Junto, a discussion group in colonial Philadelphia, that gravitated around Benjamin Franklin. On July 1, 1731, Franklin and a number of his fellow members among the Junto drew up articles of agreement to found a library, for they had discovered that their far-ranging conversations on intellectual and political themes floundered at times on a point of fact that might be found in a decent library. In colonial Pennsylvania at the time there were not many books; Books from London booksellers were expensive to purchase and slow to arrive. Franklin and his friends were mostly of moderate means, and none alone could have afforded a representative library such as a gentleman of leisure might expect to assemble. By pooling their resources in pragmatic Franklinian fashion, as the Library Company's historian wrote, "the contribution of each created the book capital of all."
Many of the first books in the collection focused on religion and education. It is notable that the first texts of the collection were written in English, when during the period most books held in academic and private libraries were only found in Latin.

The first librarian they hired, America's first, was Louis Timothee. He only held the position for a brief time. Until another librarian was found to replace him, Benjamin Franklin took over his duties. Franklin's stint as librarian ended in 1734, when he was replaced by William Parsons, the librarian for the next 12 years. Robert Greenway was the fourth librarian, whose tenure lasted until 1763.

The articles of association specified that each member after the first fifty must be approved by the directors, sign the articles, and pay the subscription.  Admitting new members and selecting new books were the directors' ordinary duties.

In the back of the library's 1741 catalog, Franklin mentioned that the library was accessible to people who were not members. Those who were not members were allowed to borrow books. However, they had to leave enough money to cover the cost of the book. Apparently, their money was given back upon returning the book. The privilege of being a member meant that books could be borrowed for free. Franklin also mentioned that the library was only open on Saturdays, for four hours in the afternoon.

On November 10, 1731, at Nicholas Scull's Bear Tavern ten persons paid their forty shillings: Robert Grace (share no. 1), Thomas Hopkinson (share no. 2),2 Benjamin Franklin (share no. 3), John Jones, Jr. (4), Joseph Breintnall (5), Anthony Nicholas (6), Thomas Godfrey (7), Joseph Stretch (8), Philip Syng, Jr. (9), and John Sober (10). It was a disappointing turnout: all but John Sober and the hatter Joseph Stretch (son of Peter Stretch), who later became a Pennsylvania assemblyman, were officers. The library now had eleven paid-up members. Joseph Stretch and his brothers provided half of the original capital to build Pennsylvania Hospital, another of Benjamin Franklin's projects.

Over time, fifty subscribers invested 40 shillings each and promised to pay ten shillings a year thereafter to buy books and maintain a shareholder's library. Therefore, "the Mother of all American subscription libraries" was established, and a list of desired books compiled in part by James Logan, "the best Judge of Books in these parts," was sent to London and by autumn the first books were on the shelves.

Earlier libraries in the Thirteen Colonies belonged to gentlemen, members of the clergy, and colleges. Members of the Library Company soon opened their own book presses to make donations: A Collection of Several Pieces, by John Locke; Logic: or, the Art of Thinking, by the Port Royalists Antoine Arnauld and Pierre Nicole, which Franklin in his autobiography said he had read at the age of 16; Plutarch's Moralia translated by Philemon Holland; Lewis Roberts' Merchants Mappe of Commerce, and others. A bit later William Rawle added a set of Spenser's Works to the collection and Francis Richardson gave several volumes, among them Francis Bacon's Sylva Sylvarum, but on the whole books in Latin were few.

Overtures to the proprietor of Pennsylvania, John Penn at Pennsbury at first elicited no more than a polite response, but an unsolicited gift of 34 pound sterling arrived in the summer of 1738 from Walter Sydserfe, a Scottish-born physician and planter of Antigua.

The earliest surviving printed catalogue of 1741 gives the range of readers' tastes, for the members' requirements shaped the collection. Excluding gifts, a third of the holdings of 375 titles were historical works, geographies and accounts of voyages and travels, a category the Library Company has collected energetically throughout its history. A fifth of the titles were literature, mostly in the form of poetry and plays, for the prose novel was still in its infancy: as late as 1783, in the first orders from London after the war years, the directors thought "we should not think it expedient to add to our present stock, anything in the novel way." Another fifth of the titles were devoted to works of science. Theology and sermons, however, accounted for only a tenth of the titles, which set the Free Library apart from collegiate libraries at Harvard and Yale. Another tenth was works of philosophy, and the rest (approximately 1/15 of the collection) was "economics and such social sciences, the arts, linguistics, and the indefinables." The Company's agent in London was Peter Collinson, Fellow of the Royal Society, the Quaker mercer-naturalist of London, who corresponded with John Bartram.

The Library Company's example was soon imitated in other cities along the Atlantic coast, from Salem to Charleston. The Library soon became a repository of other curiosities: antique coins, including a gift of Roman coins from a Tory Member of Parliament, fossils, natural history specimens, minerals. When John Penn, making up for his slow start, sent an air-pump to the learned society in 1739, the directors, to house it commissioned a glazed cabinet, the earliest extant example of American-made Palladian architectural furniture. Rooms on the second floor of the newly finished west wing of the State House (now Independence Hall) housed the Library and its collections: there Franklin and his associates performed their first experiments in electricity during the 1740s. Later Benjamin West sent the mummified hand of an Egyptian princess.

A charter was issued for the Company from the Penn proprietors, March 24, 1742, that included a plot of land, issued in their name by Governor George Thomas. Collinson, who had faithfully executed the Company's requests for books over the years, sent windfalls in 1755 and in 1758 in the form of boxes of his own copies of a score of 17th-century accounts of the newly established British colonies in America, among them such classics as Strachey's Lawes, Mourt's Relation and John Smith's Generall Historie of Virginia.

The Library Company's microscope and telescope were frequently borrowed and from time to time, needed to undergo repairs. There is also evidence that many of the library's curiosities were available to borrow if permission was obtained from any two directors. In 1769 Owen Biddle used the telescope to observe the transit of Venus from Cape Henlopen. On May 9 of that year Sarah Wistar became the first woman to be voted a library share.

Expansion
The Library absorbed smaller lending libraries and outgrew its rooms, renting larger space on the second floor of the new Carpenters' Company hall in 1773. "The Books (inclosed within Wire Lattices) are kept in one large Room," Franklin was informed in London, "and in another handsome Apartment the [scientific] Apparatus is deposited and the Directors meet." On September 5, 1774, the First Continental Congress met on the first floor of Carpenters' Hall, and the Library Company extended members' privileges to all the delegates. The offer was renewed when the Second Continental Congress met the following spring, and again when the delegates to the Constitutional Convention met in 1787. Nine signers of the Declaration of Independence — Benjamin Franklin, Benjamin Rush, Francis Hopkinson, Robert Morris, George Clymer, John Morton, James Wilson, Thomas McKean, and George Ross — owned shares, some of them serving as directors. The Library Company served virtually as the Library of Congress until the national capital was established in 1800.

Virtually every significant work on political theory, history, law, and statecraft (and much else besides) could be found on the Library Company's shelves, as well as numerous tracts and polemical writings by American as well as European authors. And virtually all of those works that were influential in framing the minds of the Framers of the nation are still on the Library Company's shelves.

In 1785 the Company purchased a collection of Revolutionary broadsheets pamphlets and other ephemera that had been assiduously collected by Pierre Eugène Du Simitière, of which no other copies have survived.

Permanent quarters were established for the Library Company in 1789 with the purchase of a lot on Fifth Street near Chestnut across from State House Square. A competition for the design of a building was won by an amateur of architecture, Dr. William Thornton, with a plan for a Palladian red-brick structure with white pilasters and a pediment interrupting a balustraded roof. A curving double flight of steps led up to the arched door under an arched niche containing a gift from William Bingham — a marble statue of Franklin in a classical toga sculpted in Italy by Francesco Lazzarini. Member's shares were extended to carpenters and bricklayers in partial payment for work on the new building. The new quarters were opened on New Year's Day, 1791. For the new library Samuel Jennings, an expatriate Philadelphian living in London, painted a large picture, "Liberty Displaying the Arts and Sciences."

In 1792 the Loganian Library, which had been housed across the square, was transferred to the Library Company, complementing its collection with the 2600 books (chiefly in Latin and Greek) that had been collected by James Logan. This collection was supplemented by the medical library of James Logan's younger brother, a physician in Bristol, England, the best medical library then in North America. Thornton's new building immediately required a new wing.

19th century
The collections went from strength to strength in the 19th century. In mid-century it was considered one of the "five great libraries" in the United States, along with the Harvard University Library, Yale University Library, Library of Congress, and Boston Athenæum.

The Library Company's collections were physically split in the mid-19th century. A large bequest from Dr. James Rush resulted in a new building at Broad and Christian streets in South Philadelphia. The Ridgway Library, as it was called, was controversial because it was both physically and socially removed from the homes and businesses of the members. A new, more centrally located, library designed by Frank Furness opened its doors in 1880 at Juniper and Locust Street.

An unrelated endeavor, the Free Library of Philadelphia, was chartered in 1891 to "be free to all", and opened March 1894.

20th century
The Library Company suffered financial troubles during the Great Depression and was forced to sell the Locust Street building and consolidate the collections in the Ridgway Library on South Broad Street. As its fortunes improved after the war, the institution focused on its mission as a scholarly research library. In the second half of the 20th century, under the direction of Edwin Wolf, an energetic program of renewal brought the Library Company once more into a busy and vital center of national importance for research and education. The Library Company completed a new building on Locust Street, also named the Ridgway Library, in 1965, and opened it to the public in April 1966.

See also
Free Library of Philadelphia
History of Public Library Advocacy
Life in Philadelphia
Public Library Advocacy

References
Notes

Further reading

 Abbot, G. M. A Short History of the Library Company of Philadelphia; Compiled from the Minutes, Together with Some Personal Reminiscences. Philadelphia: Published by order of the board of directors, 1913.
 Edmunds, A. J. "The First Books Imported by America's First Great Library: 1732 " Pennsylvania Magazine of History and Biography 30 (1906): 300–308
 Gray, A. K. Benjamin Franklin's Library: A Short Account of the Library Company of Philadelphia, 1731–1931, Foreword by Owen Wister. New York: Macmillan, 1937.
 Grimm, D. F. "A History of the Library Company of Philadelphia, 1731–1835." Doctoral dissertation, University of Pennsylvania, 1955.
 Korty, M. B. "Benjamin Franklin and Eighteenth Century American Libraries." Transactions of the American Philosophical Society 55 (1965): 1–83.
 Library Company of Philadelphia. A Catalogue of Books Belonging to the Library Company of Philadelphia: A Facsimile of the Edition of 1741 Printed by Benjamin Franklin, with an Introduction by Edwin Wolf 2nd Philadelphia: Library Company of Philadelphia 1956
 Packard, F. R. Charter Members of the Library Company. Philadelphia: Library Company of Philadelphia, 1942.
 Peterson, C. E. "The Library Hall: Home of the Library Company of Philadelphia, 1790–1880." Proceedings of the American Philosophical Society 95 (1951): 266–85.
 Smith, J. J. "Notes for a History of the Library Company of Philadelphia." Hazard's Register of Pennsylvania 16 (September 26, 1835): 201–08.
 Wolf, E. "At the Instance of Benjamin Franklin"—A Brief History of The Library Company of Philadelphia, 1731–1976. Philadelphia: Library Company of Philadelphia, 1976.
 Wolf, E. "Library Company of Philadelphia." ELIS 15 (1975): 1–19.
 Wolf, E. "Some Books of Early English Provenance in the Library Company of Philadelphia." Book Collector 9 (1960): 275–84.
 Wolf, E. "The Early Buying Policy of the Library Company of Philadelphia [1735–70]." Wilson Library Bulletin 30 (1955): 316–18.
 Wolf, E. "The First Books and Printed Catalogues of the Library Company of Philadelphia." Pennsylvania Magazine of History and Biography 78 (1954): 45–70.
 Wolf, E. "The Library Company of Philadelphia, America's First Museum." Antiques [U.S.A.] 120 (1981): 348–60.
 "Early Documents of the Library Company of Philadelphia, 1733–1734." Pennsylvania Magazine of History and Biography 39 (1915): 450–53.
 "Public Library in Philadelphia." American Magazine of Useful and Entertaining Knowledge 2 (November 1835): 91.
 "The Library Company of Philadelphia, and the Loganian Library." Norton's Literary Gazette 2 (July 15, 1852): 127.

External links

1731 establishments in Pennsylvania
History of Philadelphia
Center City, Philadelphia
Buildings and structures in Philadelphia
Organizations based in Philadelphia
Libraries in Philadelphia
Museums in Philadelphia
Libraries in British North America
Library buildings completed in the 18th century
Library buildings completed in 1880
Special collections libraries in the United States
Research libraries in the United States